

Robert Willan  (12 November 1757, near Sedbergh, Yorkshire – 7 April 1812, in Madeira) was an English physician and the founder of dermatology as a medical specialty.

Life
Willan was educated at Sedbergh School, and received his M.D. at Edinburgh in 1780 From 1781 he practised medicine in Darlington and then moved to London in 1783 as physician to the new Carey Street Public Dispensary, where he remained until 1803 teaching alongside Thomas Bateman. He was elected a Fellow of the Royal Society in 1809.

Works
Following the example of Carl Linnaeus, Willan attempted a taxonomic classification of skin diseases, describing impetigo, lupus, psoriasis, scleroderma, ichthyosis, sycosis, and pemphigus. Willan's portrait was reproduced on the cover of the British Journal of Dermatology for many years. Willan and Bateman working together provided the world's first attempt to classify skin diseases from an anatomical standpoint.

In 1790, Willan received the Fothergill Gold Medal from the Medical Society of London for his classification of skin diseases. In the same year he published an account entitled "A Remarkable Case of Abstinence", which detailed the case of a young Englishman who died in 1786 after fasting for 78 days - one of the earliest accounts of eating disorders in males.

A copy of one of his works was translated into German and published in Breslau in 1799. The English version has been lost.

In 1798, Willan described the occupational disease psoriasis diffusa, which affects the hands and arms of bakers, and in 1799 first described the exanthematous rash of childhood known as erythema infectiosum.

Willan's 1808 book, On Cutaneous Diseases is a landmark in the history of dermatology and in medical illustration and contains the first use of the word "lupus" to describe cutaneous tuberculosis.

His study of the sulphur water at Croft-on-Tees, published in 1782 London, has recently been republished.

See also
William Cullen

Notes

References
 Evans, A. S. and Kaslow, R. A. (1997).  Viral Infections of Humans. Springer. 
 Lee, H. S. J. (Ed.). (2002). Dates in Infectious Diseases: A Chronological Record of Progress in Infectious Diseases Over the Last Millennium. Taylor & Francis. 
 Levere, T., Turner L'E, G. (2002). Discussing Chemistry and Steam: The Minutes of a Coffee House Philosophical Society 1780-1787. Oxford: Oxford University Press. 
 Porter, R. and Bynum, W. F. (Eds.).(2002). William Hunter and the Eighteenth-Century Medical World. Cambridge: Cambridge University Press. 
 Sebastian, A. (2000). Dates in Medicine. Taylor and Francis. 
 Silverman, J. A. (1990). Anorexia Nervosa in the Male: Early Historic Cases. In Andersen, A. E. (Ed.). Males with Eating Disorders (pp. 3–8).

External links
 Biography
 Robert Willan's Description and Treatment of Cutaneous Diseases 1797/1798 A Bicentennial

1757 births
1812 deaths
People from Sedbergh
English dermatologists
Fellows of the Royal Society
18th-century English people
19th-century English people
18th-century English medical doctors
Alumni of the University of Edinburgh